Zdzisław Zbigniew Podkański (18 October 1949 – 18 February 2022) was a Polish politician.

Biography
Podkański was born Guzówka, Poland. He was a Member of the European Parliament (MEP) for the Lublin Voivodship with the Polish People's Party, part of the European People's Party and he was sitting on the European Parliament's Committee on Culture and Education.

Podkański was a substitute for the Committee on Agriculture and Rural Development and a vice-chair of the Delegation to the EU-Moldova Parliamentary Cooperation Committee.

He died on 18 February 2022, at the age of 72.

Education
 1972: Master of History, Maria Curie-Skłodowska University

Career
 1973–1975: Employee of the Society for the Dissemination of General Knowledge (1972–1973), then on the Voivodship Committee of the ZSL (United Peasant's Party)
 1975–1980: Vice-Chairman of the Voivodship Administration of the Naval Sports Group (ZSMW) and section head in youth organisations
 1980–1984: Section head on the Voivodship Committee of the ZSL
 1984–1992: Director of the central administration of the Association of Folk Craftsmen (STL)
 1992–1994: Plenipotentiary to the Minister of Culture and Art
 Councillor (1984–1989) and Vice-Chairman (1988–1989) People's Town Council in Lublin
 1991-: Chairman of the Voivodship Administration of the Polish People's Party (PSL) in Lublin
 since 2004: Vice-Chairman PSL
 1994–1996: Under-secretary of State at the Ministry of Culture and Art
 1996–1997: Minister of Culture and Art
 Member of Parliament of the Republic of Poland (1993–2004), Vice-Chairman of the Parliamentary Culture and Media Committee

Decorations
 Gold Cross of Merit

See also
 2004 European Parliament election in Poland

References

External links
 
 

1949 births
2022 deaths
People from Lublin County
Polish cooperative organizers
Culture ministers of Poland
United People's Party (Poland) politicians
Polish People's Party politicians
Polish People's Party MEPs
MEPs for Poland 2004–2009
Maria Curie-Skłodowska University alumni